Mark Fitzgerald may refer to:

 Mark Fitzgerald (Degrassi: The Next Generation), a character in Degrassi: The Next Generation
 Mark P. Fitzgerald (born 1951), retired United States Navy admiral